BridgeClimb Sydney is an Australian tourist attraction.

BridgeClimb guides guests on a climb of the Sydney Harbour Bridge. Since its launch on 1 October 1998, BridgeClimb has welcomed over 4 million people onto the Sydney Harbour Bridge arches. The company guides guests on with "entertaining and educational" commentary from "climb leaders" as well as views of Sydney and the surrounds.

Four different types of climbs are offered, as of July 2021. The BridgeClimb, the original climb since 1998, takes guests to the top of the bridge along the upper arch in a round-trip that takes over three hours, including preparation time. BridgeClimb Insider guides guests to the interior of the steel bridge and then to the top in just over 2.5 hours. BridgeClimb also offers the "Ultimate Climb", which sees climbers traverse the entire bridge from South to North, and back again. In 2021 BridgeClimb launched 'Burrawa', with a focus on commentary covering the Indigenous history of Sydney Harbour with an Indigenous Storyteller as their guide.

The different climbs are available at dawn, day, twilight and night and also offers special climbs for some of Sydney's events, like the Vivid Climb and the Anzac Day Dawn Climb.

The experience has also attracted many famous actors, musicians and members of royalty including Matt Damon, Kylie Minogue, Zac Efron, Robert De Niro, Prince Harry, Oprah Winfrey and Ben Stiller.

Anyone over the age of eight years and in good health can climb. There is no maximum age, with the oldest climber being 100 years old. To book a climb, visitors can visit the website, and the price is from 198 Australian dollars.

History
The concept of BridgeClimb was born in 1989 when BridgeClimb's Founder and Chairman, Paul Cave, helped conduct a Young Presidents Organisation World Congress in Sydney, which included a climb over the Sydney Harbour Bridge. Following this experience, Cave decided to make climbing the Sydney Harbour Bridge a permanent attraction. This led to many years of dealing with state and local government bodies, community groups and many experts on safety, logistics, media, heritage and conservation issues. After nearly ten years of research and development, BridgeClimb Sydney was officially launched on 1 October 1998.  At that time, BridgeClimb was the first tourism operator on a bridge anywhere in the world.

In June 2018 the franchise was awarded to Hammon's Holdings the proprietors of Scenic World for 20 years following a formal tender process.

Pylon Lookout and Museum

The Bridge's Pylon Museum and lookout houses the history and stories of the Sydney Harbour Bridge through exhibits and interactive displays. This includes the stories of the engineers, designers, skilled tradesmen and labourers and the 16 men that lost their lives during its construction. The exhibition also documents the events that took place and the people that participated in the Sydney Harbour Bridge's opening ceremony in 1932. The Pylon Lookout is also managed by BridgeClimb Sydney.

Awards
The company has received several accolades, including a world record for number of flags flown on a bridge recognised by Guinness World Records.

In 2007, BridgeClimb was awarded best "Major Tourist Attraction" at the Qantas Australian Tourism Awards. Lonely Planet has recognised BridgeClimb Sydney as one of the world's top 10 'Biggest Adrenaline Rush' experiences as well as one of the '10 Best Things to Climb'. In 2011 and 2012, BridgeClimb was awarded 'Best Guided Tour in Australia' at the Australian Traveller Readers' Choice Awards. In 2016, BridgeClimb was awarded 'Best Guided Tour in Australia' by the Australian Traveller Reader's Choice Awards and best 'Major tourism Attraction' at the New South Wales Tourism Awards.

References

External links
BridgeClimb official site

Companies based in Sydney
Travel and holiday companies of Australia
Tourist attractions in Sydney
1998 establishments in Australia
Adventure travel